Scopula johnsoni is a moth of the family Geometridae described by David Stephen Fletcher in 1958. It is endemic to Uganda.

References

Endemic fauna of Uganda
Moths described in 1958
johnsoni
Moths of Africa